Spialia mangana, the Arabian grizzled skipper, is a butterfly in the family Hesperiidae. It was described by Rebel in 1899. It is found in Yemen, Oman, Somalia, Ethiopia, Uganda and northern Kenya.

References

Spialia
Butterflies described in 1899
Butterflies of Africa
Taxa named by Hans Rebel